Weinbaum is an impact crater in the Mare Australe quadrangle of Mars, located at 65.5°S latitude and 245.4°W longitude. It measures  in diameter and was named after American science fiction writer Stanley Weinbaum (1902–1935). The name was adopted in 1973 by the International Astronomical Union (IAU) Working Group for Planetary System Nomenclature.

See also 
 List of craters on Mars

References 

Mare Australe quadrangle
Impact craters on Mars